Larisa Buranova (born 3 April 1969, Izhevsk) is a Russian political figure, deputy of the State Duma of the 8th convocation.

In 1969 she graduated from the Udmurt State University with a major degree in history. From 1991 to 1995, Buranova worked as a history teacher. In 1995 she was assigned the head specialist of the committee on nationalities under the government of Udmurtia. In 1999, when the committee was transformed into the Republican Ministry of National Policy, she was appointed head of the department. From 2008 to 2014, she worked as the First Deputy Minister of National Policies. In 2014 she was appointed the Minister of National Policies of Udmurtia.

Since September 2021, she has served as a deputy of the 8th State Duma convocation.

Sanctions
In December 2022 the EU sanctioned Larisa Buranova in relation to the 2022 Russian invasion of Ukraine.

References

1969 births
Living people
United Russia politicians
21st-century Russian politicians
Eighth convocation members of the State Duma (Russian Federation)